Roche Méane is a two-summit peak in the Massif des Écrins in the French Alps. It is located on the crest between Barre des Écrins and La Meije. The two summits are located in the small massif of La Grande Ruine, the highest summit of which is that of Pointe Brevoort, which is next to Roche Méane. Below the summits are rocky cliffs and three glaciers: the Clot des Cavales, the Grande Ruine glacier, and the Supérieur des Agneaux. In 1907 Baedeker described the mountain as a "very difficult" two-and-a-half-hour ascent from this last.

The Société des touristes du Dauphiné maintains a travellers' refuge on the crest, reached in four and a half hours from Alpe de Villar d'Arène.

References

Mountains of Hautes-Alpes